William Frederik Duntzfelt (12 June 1792 – 12 October 1863) was a Danish merchant.  He continued Duntzfelt & Co. but left the company in 1825. He was also a member of the 1848 Danish Constituent Assembly.

Early life and education
Duntzfelt was born in Copenhagen, the son of merchant William Duntzfelt and Marie Henriette de Coninck (1774–1843). His maternal grandfather was the wealthy merchant Frédéric de Coninck.

Career
He continued the family firm after his father's death in 1809 and was granted citizenship as a merchant in 1812. He became a member of 's committee in 1819 but pulled out of Duntzfelt & Co. in 1825.

He was one of the directors of the Danish Asiatic Company in 1837 and headed the liquidation of the company in 1843.

Politics
Duntzfelt became one of the City's 32 Men in 1838 and continued his position on the Copenhagen City Council in 1840. He became a councilman in 1848.

Duntzfelt was elected to the Roskilde Provincial Assembly in 1842, 1844, and 1846 and was also a member of the 1849 Danish Constituent Assembly.

He was awarded the title  in 1857 and the Order of the Dannebrog in 1840.

Personal life
 
 
He married Bertha Christmas (1797–1872), daughter of ship captain John Christmas (1757–1822) and Johanne Marie Heinrich (1770–1802), on 13 October 1814 in the Reformed Church in Copenhagen. They had two children, Marie Duntzfelt and Edouard Duntzfelt.

Duntzfelt died on 12 October 1863 and is buried in Assistens Cemetery.

References

External links

 William Frederik Duntzfelt  at geni.com

19th-century Danish businesspeople
Danish Asiatic Company people
19th-century Copenhagen City Council members
Businesspeople from Copenhagen
1792 births
1863 deaths
Members of the Constituent Assembly of Denmark